Tom Veierød (born 6 September 1937) is a Norwegian civil servant.

He was born in Gran, and is a cand.philol. by education. He worked as chief administrative officer in Harstad municipality from 1985 to 1990, as permanent under-secretary of state in the Ministry of Church, Education and Research from 1990 to 1992, as CEO of Statskonsult from 1992 to 1995 and general director of the Norwegian Association of Local and Regional Authorities from 1995 to 2001.

He is married to Tove Veierød.

References

1937 births
Living people
Norwegian civil servants